Ermanno Mauro, OC (born 20 January 1939, in Rovigno d'istria) is an Italian-born Canadian operatic tenor who has received the Order of Canada.

He emigrated to Canada in 1958, becoming a naturalized citizen in 1963. He has sung all over the world including at the Metropolitan Opera, Teatro alla Scala (La Scala), Royal Opera House, Palais Garnier, and many more. In 1976 and 1979, he sang as lead Tenor at Palais Garnier. Ermanno has also played the lead role in many famous Operas such as, Il trovatore, Pagliacci, La bohème, etc.

References

External links
 "Ermanno Mauro", The Canadian Encyclopedia
 Ermanno Mauro profile on the Etobicoke Philharmonic Orchestra website]
 Ermanno Mauro file listing, Mississauga Library System
Edmonton Opera reimagines Puccini's greatest opera Turandot
Opera Master Class

Italian emigrants to Canada
Living people
1939 births
Naturalized citizens of Canada
Officers of the Order of Canada
Canadian operatic tenors
20th-century Canadian male opera singers